is a train station in the city of Fuji, Shizuoka Prefecture, Japan, operated by the private railway operator Gakunan Railway.

Lines

Station layout
Jatco mae Station has one side platform serving a single bi-directional track. There is no station building and the station is unattended.

Adjacent stations

Station history
Jatco-mae Station was opened on November 18, 1949 as  after the large Nissan Motors Fuji assembly plant located nearby. The plant was sold in June 1999 to the Nissan subsidiary Jatco, and the station was accordingly renamed on April 1, 2005.

Passenger statistics
In fiscal 2017, the station was used by an average of 115 passengers daily (boarding passengers only).

Surrounding area
 Jatco

See also
 List of Railway Stations in Japan

References

External links

  

Railway stations in Shizuoka Prefecture
Railway stations in Japan opened in 1949
Fuji, Shizuoka